Zheldybino is a rural locality (a settlement) in Kiprevskoye Rural Settlement, Kirzhachsky District, Vladimir Oblast, Russia. The population was 44 as of 2010. There are 3 streets.

Geography 
Zheldybino is located 13 km northeast of Kirzhach (the district's administrative centre) by road. Baburino is the nearest rural locality.

References 

Rural localities in Kirzhachsky District